Adolescent idiopathic scoliosis is a rather common disorder in which the spine starts abnormally curving sideways (scoliosis) at the age of 10–18 years old. This disorder generally occurs during the growth spurt that happens right before and during adolescence. In some teens, the curvature is progressive, meaning that it gets worse over time, however this is rare, since it is more common for this variant of scoliosis to show itself as a mild curvature.

Signs and symptoms 

Since most cases of AIS are mild, teens with the condition typically don't show any obvious signs such as pain.

Most symptoms associated with AIS consist of physical features that would not normally be present in a teenager without the condition, these include asymmetry of the waist, shoulders, and legs (the latter involving length), prominence of the shoulder blades, abnormal walking, leaning towards one side of the body in a constant basis, tilting of the pelvis, and elevation of the hips. Signs that aren't involved with the body itself include the finding that clothes don't fit as well as they should be doing.

Complications 

Most patients with AIS don't go on to develop health complications due to the fact that most cases of the condition are usually non-progressive and/or mild to moderate in severity. Those who do develop complications usually are part of the smaller group of AIS patients with severe cases, the most common health complications among this group of patients are abnormalities that involve the lungs (such as bilateral reduction in lung volume), these abnormalities usually result in impairments of the respiratory function ranging from mild to severe.

Other complications associated with severe scoliosis include internal intrathoracic organ displacement and the disruption of appropriate rib movement. Back pain is the most common of complications that are sometimes experienced by patients with non-severe cases and patients with severe cases alike.

Patients with extremely severe cases of AIS (usually more than 100° Cobb angle) don't typically live for long and generally die prematurely.

Causes 
The cause of this disorder in most teens is generally unknown. Although it is thought to be caused by both genetic and environmental factors.

Genetics 

30% of teens with the disorder have a family history of AIS, although most of them don't have a known genetic cause (that is, a gene and mutation that can be identified as the main/partial culprit for the condition).

Various genetic variants have been described in medical literature as capable of increasing one's susceptibility of developing adolescent idiopathic scoliosis. Some of those genes include:

CHD7 

In a study done in 2006, genomewide linkage scans were performed on 130 patients from 53 families where adolescent idiopathic scoliosis segregated as a familial trait, these scans narrowed the AIS loci in these families to the 8q12 locus (in chromosome 8). Further genetic testing found 23 different polymorphisms in the CHD7 gene of these same patients, all of which were located inside a 116-kb genomic region which consisted of exons 2-4 of the same gene. The authors of the study noted that mutations in this gene are usually involved in the CHARGE syndrome, which has late-onset scoliosis as one of its common associated features. The SNPS were as follows:

rs4738813, with the C allele representing a higher risk of AIS
rs12544305, with the G allele representing a higher risk of AIS
rs9643371, with the T allele representing a higher risk of AIS
rs1017861, with the G allele representing a higher risk of AIS
rs13256023, with the T allele representing a higher risk of AIS
rs4288413, with the A allele representing a higher risk of AIS
rs7000766, with the G allele representing a higher risk of AIS
hcv148921, with the A allele representing a higher risk of AIS
rs1483207, with the G allele representing a higher risk of AIS
rs1483208, with the A allele representing a higher risk of AIS
rs1038351, with the T allele representing a higher risk of AIS
rs7843033, with the C allele representing a higher risk of AIS
rs7002806, with the T allele representing a higher risk of AIS
rs7842389, with the T allele representing a higher risk of AIS
rs7017676, with the A allele representing s higher risk of AIS
hcv509505, with the G allele representing a higher risk of AIS
rs4392940, with the A allele representing a higher risk of AIS
rs4237036, with the T allele representing a higher risk of AIS
rs13280978, with the T allele representing a higher risk of AIS
rs4301480, with the A allele representing a higher risk of AIS
rs10957159, with the G allele representing a higher risk of AIS
rs10092214, with the A allele representing a higher risk of AIS
rs3763591, with the T allele representing a higher risk of AIS

The authors believed that the decrease of functional CHD7 protein during the growth spurt that occurs during adolescence predisposed the individuals to their spinal deformity by disrupting normal growth patterns and turning them abnormal.

PAX1 

In a study done in 2015, evidence was found for a sex-linked genetic cause of AIS; by performing a genomewide association study on more than 3,000 "idiopathic scoliosis" patients, the authors found that SNPs in the 20p11.2 locus (specifically those located in the PAX1 gene) were associated with a higher chance of developing adolescent scoliosis, moreover, these genetic variants were shown to increase the risk of AIS significantly for women, while barely doing the same for men. They also found that the same genetic variants that increased the risk of AIS also reduced the risk of early-onset hair loss in the participants involved in the study.

LBX1 

A Japanese study done in 2011 found an SNP associated with an increased risk of developing adolescent idiopathic scoliosis. Another study (Chinese) done in 2012 supported this same idea.

The SNP in question is called rs11190870. This SNP was located in an area 75 kb 3' of the LBX1 gene, an intergenic area that also happened to be close to a separate gene called FLJ41350.

The authors of a separate Japanese study (done in 2015) created animal models relating to the gene, said animal models consisted of zebrafishes which were made to have overexpression of the three Lbx1 genes, this overexpression was found to cause early-onset scoliosis in the zebrafish used for the study.

A 2021 Chinese study found another SNP (rs1322330) in the gene that was associated with the condition. Participants included 1,980 AIS patients and 2,499 healthy control subjects, all patients and control subjects were of Han Chinese ancestry. "A" was the risk allele for the condition.

GPR126 

In a different Japanese study done in 2013, researchers found an SNP (rs6570507) which was associated with an increased risk of AIS, said SNP was found in the GPR126 gene, located in chromosome 6. This same SNP is associated with increased length of the trunk in people of primarily European ancestry.

A Chinese study done in 2015 found evidence for an association between three SNPS in intronic regions of the gene and AIS. They were as follows:

rs6570507 (A>G), with G being the risk allele for AIS
rs7774095 (A>C), with C being the risk allele for AIS
rs7755109 (A>G), with G being the risk allele for AIS

BNC2 

An SNP known as rs10738445 increases the risk of AIS, this gene is located in the aforementioned gene, and the risk allele for adolescent idiopathic scoliosis is A, while the normal allele is C. It has only been studied in AIS patients of Han Chinese ancestry.

SLC39A8 

In a study done in 2018, a group of researchers performed an exome-wide association study on more than 1,000 European-American patients with severe adolescent idiopathic scoliosis and found an SNP (rs13107325) which was seen to be strongly associated with the condition in said patients. Other features that were seen to be associated with the 391T scoliosis risk allele included short stature, lower-than-average plasma Mn2+ levels, and a high body mass index. The researchers leading the study decided to do an animal model to simulate the effects of the mutation by engineering zebrafish with homozygous tandem duplications in their SLC39A8 genes, most of said zebrafish developed vertebral and thoracical deformities and were short of body length.

NTF3 

In a Chinese study done in 2012, 500 patients with AIS were recruited for a genomewide  association study, the researchers leading said study found an SNP (rs11063714) in the NTF3 gene which, while not necessarily involved in the patients' AIS itself, was involved in the severity of the scoliosis itself; patients who were homozygous for the A allele (AA genotype) tended to have milder scoliosis than patients who were homozygous for the G allele at the same position (GG genotype), the latter group of patients were more likely to suffer from severe scoliosis, moreover, patients with the AA genotype were more likely to have successful results from brace treatment than those with the GG genotype.

FBN1 

In a study done in 2014, researchers did whole-exome sequencing on 91 Caucasian patients with severe adolescent idiopathic scoliosis and 331 Caucasian control subjects in order to find rare to very rare genetic mutations that might be deleterious and involved in AIS. The list of mutations that were considered rare by the researchers consisted of coding variants that were absent on the dbSNP database and caused insertions, deletions, frameshift, splice-site, or missense mutations.

Rare mutations in the FBN1 and FBN2 genes were found in AIS patients and control subjects alike, the following list consists specifically of the mutations found in the FBN1 gene:

T>A missense mutation (p. Ile107Leu) at chr15:48 902 952
T>G missense mutation (p.Asn280Thr) at chr15:48 826 300
T>C missense mutation (p.Gln697Arg) at chr15:48 796 007
T>G missense mutation (p.Asn703His) at chr15:48 795 990
C>T missense mutation (p. Val916Met) at chr15:48 784 766
C>T missense mutation (p.Gly1217Ser) at chr15:48 777 634
G>A missense mutation (p.Pro1225Leu) at chr15:48 777 609
C>T missense mutation (p.Gly1313Ser) at chr15:48 773 879
A>C missense mutation (p. Leu1405Arg) at chr15:48 764 870
A>G missense mutation (p.Met1576Thr) at chr15:48 760 155
C>T missense mutation (p.Arg1850His) at chr15:48 741 087
C>T missense mutation (p.Gly2003Arg) at chr15:48 736 768
A>T missense mutation (p.Asn2178Lys) at chr15:48 726 873
T>A missense mutation (p.Tyr2225Phe) at chr15:48 725 128
A>G missense mutation (p. Ile2585Thr) at chr15:48 712 949
C>T missense mutation (p. Val2868Ile) at chr15:48 703 201

Of the 16 FBN1 mutations listed, three had previously been described as associated with Marfan syndrome, a rare autosomal dominant genetic disorder characterized by Marfanoid habitus, joint hypermobility, and cardiac problems.

FBN2 

The same 2014 study mentioned above also detected mutations in the FBN2 of some of the people they used for the study, they were the following:

C>T missense mutation (p.Gly53Asp) at chr5:127 873 139
C>T missense mutation (p.Arg92Lys) at chr5:127 872 157
A>ACTGTA frameshift mutation at chr5:127 782 238
C>T missense mutation (p. Val592Met) at chr5:127 713 520
G>T missense mutation (p.Pro740His) at chr5:127 704 904
G>A missense mutation (p.Arg1021Cys) at chr5:127 681 205
A>C missense mutation (p. Ile1116Ser) at chr5:127 674 750
G>C missense mutation (p. Leu1125Val) at chr5:127 674 724
C>T missense mutation (p.Glu1178Lys) at chr5:127 673 755
C>G missense mutation (p.Gly1271Ala) at chr5:127 671 182
G>T missense mutation (p.Pro2085Thr) at chr5:127 627 260
T>C missense mutation (p. Ile2466Val) at chr5:127 613 647
A>G missense mutation (p.Phe2603Ser) at chr5:127 609 564
C>T missense mutation (p.Gly2620Glu) at chr5:127 607 792

AKAP2 

In a 2016 study done on a single Chinese family with familial adolescent idiopathic scoliosis, researchers found a c.2645A>C missense mutation in the AKAP2 gene of affected members by performing whole exome sequencing.

Said genetic variant wasn't found in 1,254 AIS patients and 1,232 control subjects in another 2017 Chinese study. All participants in this study were of Chinese descent.

Copy number variants 

In a different study done in 2014, researchers did genomewide copy number variant screening on 143 patients with AIS and in 1,079 control subjects (which consisted of 666 healthy control subjects from a previous bipolar disorder study and 413 patients from a previous congenital clubfoot study). The following list consists of the CNVs found in the participants of the study:

1q21.1 duplication, found in 3 out of the 143 patients with AIS (2.1%) and in 1 out of the 1,079 control subjects (0.09%).
Family history examination in the patients with the duplication did not find any reports of intellectual disability or developmental delay, two usual findings in patients with the 1q21.1 duplication syndrome.
X chromosome duplication, found in 2 out of the 143 patients (1.4%) and in 1 out of the 529 female control subjects (0.19%).
Said patients were female, and thus had a 47,XXX karyotype (instead of the usual 46,XX female karyotype), the only clinical finding that the 2 patients with trisomy X shared was tall stature, with no signs of intellectual disability or developmental delay whatsoever.
2q13 duplication, found in 1 out of the 143 AIS patients and in 7 out of the 1,079 control subjects
15q11.2 deletion, found in 1 out of the 143 AIS patients and in 4 out of the 1,079 control subjects
15q11.2 duplication, found in 1 out of the 143 AIS patients and in 5 out of the 1,079 control subjects
16p11.2 duplication, found in 1 out of the 143 AIS patients and in 2 out of the 1,079 control subjects
The only AIS patient with this chromosomal duplication also had spina bifida occulta.

Diagnosis 

This condition can be diagnosed through the use of the following diagnostic methods:

Physical examination
Asymmetric shoulders
Asymmetric leg length
Cavovarus
Prominent ribs
Physical tests such as Adams test
MRIs
Radiographs

For adolescent idiopathic scoliosis to be considered as a diagnostic option in the patient, said patient must be between the ages of 10 and 18 years old.

Treatment 

Treatment for mild cases of AIS (less than 20° Cobb angle) usually consists of regular physical check-ups done in a clinical environment to monitor the deformity, the purpose of these check-ups is to be able to detect possible progression of the deformity early-on to have it properly treated., as well as the use of other methods such as Schroth's method and stretching exercises.

Treatment for moderate cases of AIS (between 20 and 40° Cobb angle) usually consists of the usage of bracing of the spine, this usually doesn't correct the deformity in and on itself, but rather, prevents it from progressing any further (that is, progressing into a severe case of scoliosis).

Treatment for severe cases of AIS (more than 40° Cobb angle) consists of corrective surgery which usually involves bone grafts and the insertion of proper spinal instrumentation into the spine. The latter treatment methods don't have high post-surgical complication rates.

Epidemiology 

This condition affects between 1-4% of teens (1 in 100–1 in 25). But only 0.25% (1 in 400) of them need treatment for it. And an even smaller portion of them die prematurely due to a severe curvature. and the symptoms it causes. AIS is the most common form of idiopathic scoliosis, accounting for around 90% of all cases of IS. Post-surgical complications are most common among people with coexisting health conditions (such as anemia) and males. It appears to be more common among those living in northern latitudes.

Although mild curvatures affect females and males equally (incidence-wise), severe curvatures tend to affect female teens more than male teens (also incidence-wise).

See also 

Scoliosis
Kyphosis
Kyphoscoliosis

References

Further reading 

 
 
 
 
 
 
 
 
 

Idiopathic diseases
Spine